Brave New World with Stephen Hawking is a 2011 science documentary television mini-series presented by Professor Stephen Hawking who examines how science is striving for humankind's next leap forward.

The series has been released in DVD format on 16 October 2012 and includes a 16-page viewer's guide.

Episodes 
Episode 1 : Machines
Episode 2 : Health
Episode 3 : Technology
Episode 4 : Environment
Episode 5 : Biology

See also
Into the Universe with Stephen Hawking
Stephen Hawking's Universe

References

External links
 
 

2011 British television series debuts
2011 British television series endings
2010s British documentary television series
Channel 4 documentaries
2010s British television miniseries
English-language television shows
Documentary television series about science